Layth ibn Tarif was an 8th-century freedman commander and governor for the Abbasid Caliphate.

Biography
Wilhelm Barthold misidentified him as the son of Nasr ibn Sayyar, the last Umayyad governor of Khurasan., but according to the Kitab al-Aghani and other sources, Layth and his brother Mu'alla were the sons of a certain Tarif, a slave or client (mawla) of the Abbasid caliph al-Mansur (r. 754–775). Layth and his brother were purchased as slaves by al-Mansur and given to his heir al-Mahdi (r. 775–785), who set them free.

Layth is first mentioned as commanding an army against the king of Farghana under al-Masnur, while al-Mahdi sent him against the Iranian rebel al-Muqanna. Later al-Mahdi appointed him as governor of Sind. He was recalled during the brief reign of al-Hadi (r. 785–786), but reinstated to the post by Harun al-Rashid (r. 786–809). Either he or Layth ibn al-Fadl were governors of Dinawar in 796/7.

References

Sources 
 

Date of birth unknown
Date of death unknown
Generals of the Abbasid Caliphate
Abbasid governors of Sind
8th-century rulers in Asia
Slaves from the Abbasid Caliphate